Liverpool is a city in Brazoria County, Texas, United States, named after the city of Liverpool in England. It is located along the Union Pacific Railroad and County Road 171 northeast of Angleton and south of Alvin. The population was 482 at the 2010 census.

Geography

Liverpool is located in northeastern Brazoria County at  (29.299272, –95.277470). It is bordered on the east by Chocolate Bayou.

History
In 1827, a trading post was set up at Liverpool. A settlement existed in 1834 and two years later a schoolteacher was hired. The town was formally established in 1837. It became a shipping point from Stephen F. Austin's colony for wool, hides, and produce via Chocolate Bayou. A person called Commodore Nelson named the town after the English port Liverpool. A post office opened in the town in 1846, but closed in 1867. The population began to decline after the American Civil War until there were only 20 residents in 1884. Nevertheless, the post office reopened in 1879 and remained. By 1890 the population numbered 136. In 1906, the local whites-only schools counted three teachers and 48 students. By 1914, the town had grown to 400 residents and included a hotel and two general stores. The population decreased in the 1920s so that it was about 150 in 1966. By 1988 the population numbered 627, helped by the opening of a nearby Monsanto plant. The 1990 and 2000 censuses recorded around 400 residents each.

Municipal and Government services

Demographics
As of the census of 2000, there were 404 people, 152 households, and 115 families residing in the city. The population density was 425.4 people per square mile (164.2/km). There were 189 housing units at an average density of 199.0/sq mi (76.8/km). The racial makeup of the city was 88.61% White, 0.74% African American, 1.49% Native American, 0.25% Asian, 6.68% from other races, and 2.23% from two or more races. Hispanic or Latino of any race were 9.90% of the population.

There were 152 households, out of which 30.3% had children under the age of 18 living with them, 60.5% were married couples living together, 9.2% had a female householder with no husband present, and 24.3% were non-families. 19.7% of all households were made up of individuals, and 9.9% had someone living alone who was 65 years of age or older. The average household size was 2.66 and the average family size was 3.03.

In the city, the population was spread out, with 25.7% under the age of 18, 8.2% from 18 to 24, 33.4% from 25 to 44, 23.0% from 45 to 64, and 9.7% who were 65 years of age or older. The median age was 35 years. For every 100 females, there were 112.6 males. For every 100 females age 18 and over, there were 109.8 males.

The median income for a household in the city was $48,750, and the median income for a family was $51,042. Males had a median income of $36,875 versus $30,938 for females. The per capita income for the city was $19,492. About 7.0% of families and 6.6% of the population were below the poverty line, including 7.4% of those under age 18 and none of those age 65 or over.

Education

Primary and secondary schools

Public schools
Students in Liverpool attend schools in the Alvin Independent School District. It is zoned to Stevenson and Disney Elementary Schools, Alvin Junior High School, and Alvin High School.

Colleges and universities
Additionally, Alvin Community College, located in nearby Alvin, provides basic undergraduate courses and adult education. Liverpool is in the ACC taxation zone. The Texas Legislature designated Alvin ISD as being in the Alvin CC zone.

Notes

References

Cities in Brazoria County, Texas
Cities in Texas
Greater Houston